George Calvert may refer to:

 George Calvert, 1st Baron Baltimore (1579–1632), Proprietary Governor of Newfoundland and founder of the Province of Maryland
 George Henry Calvert (1803–1889), American writer, editor, essayist
 George Calvert (planter) (1768–1838), planter in Maryland
 George Calvert (bishop) (1900–1976), fourth Bishop of Calgary in the Anglican Church of Canada